Fiona Boyes is an Australian blues musician. She has been recording for more than 25 years and tours regularly in Australia, the United States, and Europe.

Boyes was part of the Australian female Blues band, The Mojo's in thh 1990s alongside Annie Packer, Gina Woods, Kaz Dalla Rosa and Paula Dowes.

Boyes released her debut studio album,Blues in My Heart in 2000.

In 2003 she won the solo/duo category at the International Blues Challenge in Memphis, Tennessee.

Boyes' debut US release Lucky 13 was nominated by the Blues Foundation in Memphis, Tennessee for the 2007 Blues Music Awards, 'Contemporary Blues Album of the Year'. She has since received three further BMA nominations for 'Traditional Female Blues Artist' (2010), 'Acoustic BluesAlbum of the Year' (2009), 'Contemporary Female Blues Artist' (2008), and her 2008 release Live From Bluesville won the US Blues Critics Award for Best Live Blues Album. Boyes has also received 15 national recording and performance awards in Australia.

Boyes has toured and recorded with many, including Hubert Sumlin and Bob Margolin. Boyes was described by Grammy Award winner and Blues Hall of Fame pianist, Pinetop Perkins, as "the best gal guitarist I heard since Memphis Minnie."

She plays both acoustic and electric, covering pre-war Delta slide, laments, single chord Mississippi Hills grooves, Piedmont finger picking, New Orleans barrelhouse, Memphis soul, classic Chicago, Texas swing, and the uptown sound of the West Coast.

Discography

Awards and nominations

Music Victoria Awards
The Music Victoria Awards are an annual awards night celebrating Victorian music. They commenced in 2006.

! 
|-
| Music Victoria Awards of 2015
| Box & Dice
| Best Blues Album
| 
|rowspan="3"|  
|-
| Music Victoria Awards of 2017
| Professin' the Blues
| Best Blues Album
| 
|-
| Music Victoria Awards of 2018
| Voodoo in the Shadows
| Best Blues Album
| 
|-

References

External links

Year of birth missing (living people)
Living people
Australian blues guitarists
Australian women guitarists
Yellow Dog Records artists